Kell Runland (born 11 January 1942) is a Danish sports shooter. He competed in the men's 25 metre rapid fire pistol event at the 1976 Summer Olympics.

References

1942 births
Living people
Danish male sport shooters
Olympic shooters of Denmark
Shooters at the 1976 Summer Olympics
Sportspeople from Copenhagen